Success is an unincorporated community in Texas County, Missouri, United States. It is located approximately twelve miles northwest of Houston at the southern intersection of Routes 17 and 32.

History
The first settlement at Success was made in 1880. The nearby original town site is today officially known as "Old Success" and is located about one mile to the north. A post office called Success has been in operation since 1880. Founders of the community most likely named it "Success" in order to promote a mineral spa established there.

Education
The Success R-VI School District has a K-8 enrollment.  The students attend Houston, Plato and Licking for high school.

References

Populated places established in 1883
Unincorporated communities in Texas County, Missouri
Unincorporated communities in Missouri